The Dharoor Valley is valley located in the Bari province of the autonomous Puntland region in northeastern Somalia. It possesses relatively abundant grazing terrain for pastoralism, similar to the Noobir. Along with the Nugaal Valley, the Dharoor Valley has been a center for oil exploration in Puntland.

References

See also
Nugaal Valley

Valleys of Somalia